Huna may refer to:

Anthropological 
 Hara Huna Kingdom, ancient Chinese tribe
 Huna people, invaders of northern India 5th–9th century
 Huna Kingdom

Places 
 Huna, Caithness, Scotland
 Man Huna, a village in Sagaing Township, Burma

People 
 Daniel Huňa (born 1979), Czech football player
 Huna b. Joshua, a Jewish Amora sage
 Huna Kamma, a Jewish Tanna sage
 Huna b. Nathan, a Jewish Amora sage
 James Te Huna (born 1981), New Zealand mixed martial artist
 Jodi Te Huna or Jodi Brown (born 1981), New Zealand netball player
 Mar ben Huna (died c. 614), head of the Sura Academy
 Raba bar Rav Huna (died 322), Jewish Talmudist in Babylonia
 Rav Huna (c. 216–c. 296), Jewish Talmudist in Babylonia, head of the Academy of Sura
 Richard Huna (born 1985), Slovak ice hockey player
 Robert Huna (born 1985), Slovak ice hockey player
 Rudolf Huna (born 1980), Slovak ice hockey player
 Huna of Thorney (born 7th century), Anglo-Saxon saint

Other uses 
 Huna (New Age), in metaphysics
 "Huna Buna", a song from Zephyr (Zephyr album)

See also 
 Hun (disambiguation)